Chenar Bon or Chenarbon may refer to various places in Iran:
 Chenar Bon, Gilan
 Chenar Bon, Kohgiluyeh and Boyer-Ahmad
 Chenar Bon, Babol, Mazandaran Province
 Chenar Bon, Gatab, Babol County, Mazandaran Province
 Chenar Bon, Neka, Neka County, Mazandaran Province
 Chenar Bon, Hezarjarib, Neka County, Mazandaran Province
 Chenar Bon, Nowshahr, Mazandaran Province
 Chenar Bon, Sari, Mazandaran Province
 Chenarbon, Tonekabon, Mazandaran Province